This article lists political parties in Mali.
Mali has a multi-party system with numerous political parties, in which no one party often has a chance of gaining power alone, and parties must work with each other to form coalition governments.

The parties

Parliamentary parties
Hope 2002 (Espoir 2002)
Rally for Mali (Rassemblement pour le Mali)
National Congress for Democratic Initiative (Congres Nationale pour la Initiative Démocratie)
Patriotic Movement for Renewal (Mouvement Patriotique  pour le Renouveau) 
Rally for Labour Democracy (Rassemblement pour la Démocratie du Travail)
Alliance for Democracy in Mali (Alliance pour la Démocratie en Mali-Parti Pan-Africain pour la Liberté, la Solidarité et la Justice)
Convergence for Alternance and Change (Convergence pour l'Alternance et changement)
Party for National Renewal (Parti pour la renaissance nationale)
Sudanese Union-African Democratic Rally (Union Soudanaise-Rassemblement Démocratique Africain)
African Solidarity for Democracy and Independence (Solidarité Africaine pour la Démocratie et l'Indépendance)

Other parties
These parties might be part of the Convergence for Alternance and Change alliance.
Block of Alternative for the Renewal of Africa
Democratic and Social Convention
Movement for the Independence, Renaissance, and Integration of Africa
Movement for Environmental Education and Sustainable Development
Party for Democracy and Progress
Party for National Renewal
Rally for National Democracy
Rally for Democracy and Labor
Rally for Democracy and Progress
Union of Democratic Forces for Progress
Union for Democracy and Development
Union for the Republic and Democracy

Defunct parties
Democratic Union of the Malian People

See also
 Politics of Mali
 Elections in Mali

References 

Mali
 
Political parties
Political parties
Mali